Andrew Mavor Brown (born 3 May 1956) is a Scottish former journalist and broadcaster who is now a media strategist with EDF Energy.

Early life and career
Brown studied journalism at Edinburgh University, edited the student newspaper, and was President of the Edinburgh University Students' Association.  He began working for BBC Scotland as a news reporter in 1977, before moving to London to work for his brother Gordon Brown, the future prime minister, as a research assistant in 1983.  In 1987 he joined the BBC's Newsnight programme as an assistant producer.  In 1989 he joined Channel 4 News, becoming a programme editor in 1994.  In 1996, he joined ITN, becoming the editor of Powerhouse, one of its political programmes.

In 2003, Brown left the news industry and joined PR company Weber Shandwick as director of media strategy.  In 2004, he joined French energy firm EDF Energy, as head of media relations, where  he held the position of director of corporate communications.

Personal life
Brown has two elder brothers, John and Gordon (the former United Kingdom Prime Minister).

He is married to Clare Rewcastle Brown.

In 2009, Andrew Brown and his wife were associated with a financial scandal, when former Prime Minister Gordon Brown came under scrutiny for using taxpayers' money to pay his own family to manage his housekeeping. Andrew Brown and his wife were the recipients of this money. However, Clare publicly defended the arrangement, saying the claims were groundless, and calling the negative publicity her husband received "pretty damn unfair." The Daily Telegraph, the newspaper which ran the story, later acknowledged that Andrew never received any improper benefit.

Nuclear lobbying

The role of Brown has been discussed by the media in the context of the energy policy of the 1997-2010 Labour government and in particular the lobbying of Labour's later administrations by the nuclear industry.

MPs' expenses libel case

An article published in the Scotland on Sunday newspaper in May 2009 accused Andrew of benefiting from expenses claims made by his brother Gordon Brown. The claim led to libel proceedings being brought by Andrew against the paper, with the paper subsequently admitting that the claim had been "entirely false".

References

External links
Profile: Shining from the sidelines - Andrew Brown, head of media relations, EDF Energy - Brand Republic

1955 births
Living people
Scottish journalists
Scottish broadcasters
Alumni of the University of Edinburgh
Gordon Brown
Nuclear energy in the United Kingdom
Place of birth missing (living people)